Statistics of Belgian First Division in the 1908–09 season.

Overview

It was contested by 12 teams, and Union Saint-Gilloise won the championship.

League standings

Results

See also
1908–09 in Belgian football

References

Belgian Pro League seasons
Belgian First Division, 1913-14
1908–09 in Belgian football